{{Speciesbox
| image = Hibi macro 080124-4025 bunw.jpg
| genus = Hibiscus
| species =  macrophyllus
| authority = Roxb. ex Hornem.
| display_parents = 4
| synonyms = * Hibiscus barbatus Noronha
 Hibiscus setosus Roxb.
 Hibiscus vestitus Griff.
 Hibiscus vulpinus Reinw. ex Blume
 Pariti macrophyllum (Roxb. ex Hornem.) G.Don
 Talipariti macrophyllum (Roxb. ex Hornem.) Fryxell
 Triplochiton spathacea Alef.
}}Hibiscus macrophyllus, the largeleaf rosemallow, is an Asian species of tropical forest tree in the subfamily Malvoideae, with large leaves and yellow flowers.  Its native range is southern China, Indo-China and western Malesia (including the Philippines).

UsesH. macrophyllus'' can be grown as an ornamental plant and may be made into a green tea.

References

macrophyllus
Flora of Indo-China